General Dickinson may refer to:

Douglas Dickinson (1886–1949), British Army lieutenant general
James H. Dickinson (born c. 1962), U.S. Army general
John Dickinson (1732–1808), Pennsylvania Militia brigadier general in the American Revolutionary War
Philemon Dickinson (1739–1809), New Jersey Militia brigadier general in the American Revolutionary War
Thomas R. Dickinson (born 1945), U.S. Army brigadier general